Shelby Rogers (born October 13, 1992) is an American professional tennis player. She has career-high WTA rankings of world No. 30 in singles achieved August 2022 and No. 40 in doubles, achieved February 2022, and has won six singles and two doubles titles on the ITF Women's Circuit. She won the girls' national championship at 17. Her best results as a professional came at the 2016 French Open and the 2020 US Open where she reached the quarterfinals.

Rogers is noted for her victories against top-ranked players which include Simona Halep (No. 4) at the 2017 Australian Open, Serena Williams (No. 9) at the 2020 Top Seed Open and Ashleigh Barty (No. 1) at the 2021 US Open. Rogers is also undefeated against two-time Wimbledon champion Petra Kvitová, with wins at the 2016 French Open and 2020 US Open, the latter in which she saved four match points. Both are also the only instances in her career where she made the quarterfinals at the majors.

Personal life
From Mount Pleasant, South Carolina, Rogers followed her sister, Sabra, into tennis at the age of six. She was quickly identified by her coaches for her natural athletic ability and started competing on the national stage by the age of eleven. Home-schooled during high school, Rogers was able to focus on her tennis and quickly started receiving scholarship offers from the top schools in the U.S.

In 2009, she decided to forgo college and become a professional tennis player. On August 15, 2021, Rogers was awarded with a Bachelor of Science in psychology from Indiana University East in a ceremony at the Western Southern Open (WSO) tournament.

Professional career

2009–15: Early years, first WTA Tour tournament final

Rogers made her ITF Women's Circuit debut at the $10k event in St. Joseph in July 2009. At the 2010 Charleston Open, she had a chance to reach her first WTA Tour main-draw, but she failed in qualifications. In May 2010, she reached her first ITF final at the $50k Indian Harbour Beach, but lost to Edina Gallovits-Hall. Later that year, she won the USTA 18s Girls National Championship to earn a wildcard into the US Open, that was her first appearance in the main draw of any Grand Slam tournament. She lost to Peng Shuai in the first round in three sets. In July 2012, she won her first ITF title at the $50K Yakima, defeating Samantha Crawford in the final.

At the 2013 Internationaux de Strasbourg, she recorded her first win on the WTA Tour, defeating Marta Domachowska in the first round. She then earned another Grand Slam main-draw wildcard at the 2013 French Open, after winning the "Har-Tru USTA Pro Circuit Wild Card Challenge". With the wildcard, she won her first career Grand Slam match, over Irena Pavlovic. She then lost in the following round to the world No. 20, Carla Suárez Navarro. After that, she did well at the ITF Women's Circuit. There she won $50k Lexington Challenger, and later $75k Albuquerque Championships.

The following year, she reached her first WTA final at the 2014 Gastein Ladies where she lost to Andrea Petkovic. There she also defeated two top-20 players, Carla Suárez Navarro and Sara Errani. Soon after that, she scored her first career top-ten win after beating Eugenie Bouchard in the second round of the Canadian Open. The following week, she debuted at the top 100. In September, she reached semifinal of the Tournoi de Québec, but then lost to Venus Williams. Despite not producing such good performances during the season of 2015, Rogers played in all four Grand Slam main draws for the first time in her career, and also reached her first Grand Slam third round at the US Open.

2016–17: French Open QF, breakthrough

Although she missed the Australian Open due to injury, Rogers began the year strongly by reaching her second career final on the WTA Tour, losing to Francesca Schiavone at the Rio Open on clay in February. Things then did not do well for Rogers, with early losses in the following three months.

However, she then reached her first Grand Slam quarterfinal at the French Open. She became the first American other than Serena Williams to reach the quarterfinals since Venus Williams in 2006. Along the way, she defeated three seeded players including No. 12, Petra Kvitová and No. 19, Karolína Plíšková. In the quarterfinal-round match, she lost to later champion Garbiñe Muguruza. With this run, she also rose to the top 60 for the first time. Despite making big progress, she then continued to struggle again with the results by the end of the year.

During the season of 2017, she continued to progress. In the opening week, she defeated world top 10, Eugenie Bouchard, in the first-year match. She then participated at the Hobart International, where she reached the quarterfinals. At the Australian Open, she upset world No. 4, Simona Halep, 6–3, 6–1 in the first round.
 She started clay-court season with the quarterfinal of the Premier-level Charleston Open, where she also defeated compatriot and world No. 11, Madison Keys. After early losses at the Italian Open and Madrid Open, she reached the quarterfinals of the Internationaux de Strasbourg.

She then followed with a third round showing at the French Open. At Wimbledon, she reached another Grand Slam third round, but then lost to world No. 1, Angelique Kerber. At the US Open, she also reached third round, where she was stopped by another top-10 player, Elina Svitolina.

2018–20: From injury to progress, US Open QF
After battling a knee injury for some time, Rogers underwent knee surgery in May 2018. From the start of the 2018, she played only at the Australian Open and Indian Wells, but was knocked out in the first round in both tournaments. She was out of play for the rest of the season.

She returned to action at the Charleston Open in April 2019 and won her first match, defeating Evgeniya Rodina in straight sets. However, she lost her next match to Jeļena Ostapenko in three sets, after having been 5–1 up in the third set and having match points. Later, she reached second round of the French Open and Mallorca Open. In September 2019, she won the $60K Templeton, that was her first ITF title since September 2013. In October 2019, she reached the final of the $80K Macon, where she lost to her compatriot Katerina Stewart.

She enjoyed a successful campaign on American hardcourts in the summer of the 2020. She made the semifinals at the Top Seed Open, after upsetting Serena Williams in the previous round.
Then, at the US Open, she beat Irina Khromacheva, 11th seed Elena Rybakina, Madison Brengle, and sixth seed Petra Kvitová before losing to Naomi Osaka in the quarterfinals. She returned to the top 60 rankings after that.

2021: Australian Open 4th round, major doubles QF, top 40 in singles
Rogers reached the fourth round of the Australian Open, her best showing at this major, where she was defeated by world No. 1 and top seed, Ash Barty.

Shelby raised to a career-high of No. 46, after reaching the round of 16 of the Charleston Open where she lost again to Ash Barty.

At the French Open, she reached the quarterfinals in doubles, partnering Petra Martić, defeating ninth seeded pair of Sharon Fichman and Giuliana Olmos. The pair reached also as alternates the quarterfinals of the Madrid Open.

At Wimbledon, Rogers reached the third round for a second time, defeating 15th seed Maria Sakkari. This was her 16th victory over a top-20 player in her career. As a result, she reached a new career-high of world No. 40.

At the US Open, Rogers reached the round of 16 by defeating the top seed, Ash Barty.

2022: Second major doubles QF & top 40, WTA 500 singles final & top 30
On January 10, 2022, after reaching the quarterfinals with a defeat over world No. 6 and third seed, Maria Sakkari, at the Adelaide International, she reached a new career-high in singles at No. 36.

In doubles, she reached the quarterfinals of the Australian Open, partnering Petra Martić. Following the tournament, she reached also a new career-high in the top 40, on 28 February 2022. She hired Piotr Sierzputowski, Iga Świątek's former coach, around this time.

At the French Open, she upset world No. 9, Danielle Collins, to reach the third round for the third time in her career before losing to 20th seed Daria Kasatkina.

At the Libéma Open, she reached semifinals defeating Kirsten Flipkens. However, she lost to top seed Aryna Sabalenka.

At the Silicon Valley Classic, she reached again the semifinals defeating Bianca Andreescu, top seed Maria Sakkari again (her third top-5 career win) and Amanda Anisimova. She did not lose a set in the three matches, while only dropping 18 games. She ended up reaching the third final and first at a WTA 500 event in her career, defeating Veronika Kudermetova, also in straight sets. She lost to seventh seed Daria Kasatkina in the final. As a result, she reached top 30 in singles, on 8 August 2022.

2023 
Rogers started the 2023 season at the 2 Adelaide Internationals. At the Australian Open, Rogers lost in the second round to Aryna Sabalenka in straight sets.

Performance timelines

Only main-draw results in WTA Tour, Grand Slam tournaments, Fed Cup/Billie Jean King Cup and Olympic Games are included in win–loss records.

Singles
Current through the 2023 Indian Wells Open.

Doubles

WTA career finals

Singles: 3 (3 runner-ups)

Doubles: 1 (runner-up)

ITF Circuit finals

Singles: 10 (6 titles, 4 runner–ups)

Doubles: 7 (2 title, 5 runner–ups)

WTA Tour career earnings
Current after the 2022 Wimbledon.

Career Grand Slam statistics

Seedings
The tournaments won by Rogers are in boldface, and advanced into finals by Rogers are in italics.

Best Grand Slam results details
Grand Slam winners are in boldface, and runner–ups are in italics.

Singles

Head-to-head records

Record against top 10 players
Rogers's record against players who have been ranked in the top 10. Active players are in boldface.

No. 1 wins

Wins over top 10 players

Notes

References

External links

 
 
 

1992 births
Living people
American female tennis players
Sportspeople from Charleston, South Carolina
Tennis people from South Carolina
21st-century American women